Norelius is a Swedish surname that may refer to
Benkt Norelius (1886–1974), Swedish gymnast
Charles Norelius (1882–1974), Swedish-American swimmer and coach
Eric Norelius (1833–1916), Swedish-American Lutheran minister, church leader, and author
Kristine Norelius (born 1956), American rower 
Martha Norelius (1911–1955), Swedish-born American swimmer, daughter of Charles

Swedish-language surnames